Thrasher is a skateboarding magazine founded in January 1981 by Eric Swenson and Fausto Vitello. The publication consists primarily of skateboard- and music-related articles, photography, interviews and skatepark reviews.

The magazine also maintains a website and YouTube page, which includes segments with names such as "Firing Line" and "Hall of Meat", an online store, a video collection, a radio show, and a forum for registered users. The company also owns and operates the Double Rock indoor skateboarding facility, and the San Francisco skateshop, 66 6th.

History 
Thrasher was founded in 1981 by Fausto Vitello and Eric Swenson, primarily as a way to promote Independent Truck Company, their skateboard truck company. The magazine's first editor was Kevin Thatcher. Mofo became the second staff member, joining Thatcher in mid-1981.

In 1993, Jake Phelps was named editor of the magazine. With him, he brought the punk-skater ethic to the world through his photojournalism, changing the essence of Thrasher, and in turn changing the sub-culture of skateboarding forever. In 1999, the magazine sponsored a PlayStation game called Thrasher Presents Skate and Destroy. Vitello's son, Tony, took over as owner of the magazine after his father died of a heart attack in 2006, and Swenson committed suicide in 2011. On March 14, 2019, long-time editor Jake Phelps died.  

Photographer Michael Burnett is the magazine's current editor-in-chief.

Website 
The magazine's website features regularly updated episodes of segments and hosts a forum in which registered users can engage in online discussion.

Segments Include:
 "Burnout" (long-running photographic blog operated by senior staff photographer Michael Burnett)
 "Double Rock"
 "Firing Line"
 "Hall of Meat" (Video segments featuring skateboarders injuring themselves during trick attempts)
 "Skateline" (Hosted by Gary Rogers)
 "Bru-Ray" (Tour edits by Thrasher Magazine filmer P-Stone)
 "My War" (In-depth video footage following individual skaters and their struggles in completing an iconic or famous trick)
 "Manramp" (A 6-episode series featuring Manramp, skateboarding's iconic mascot)

Skater of the Year 
The title of "Skater of the Year" is awarded annually by Thrasher. The tradition was started in 1990, and the accolade remains one of the most respected awards in global skateboarding culture. The title is bestowed to one skater annually and announced by Thrashers editor. Chris Cole, Danny Way and Tyshawn Jones are the only double recipients.

King of the Road 
In 2003, Thrasher started the King of the Road (KOTR) skateboarding competition. In the contest, a group of pre-invited teams of professional skaters are each given a booklet containing a series of challenges. Points are awarded at the completion of each challenge. The teams compete at the same time over a two-week period, in which they travel across the United States to complete as many challenges as possible.  In 2011, Thrasher and Converse hosted the competition in China, with the participation of the four biggest Chinese skateboard deck companies.

KOTR was held annually since its inception, with the exceptions of 2008 and 2009, until 2018. 

From 2016-2018, King of the Road aired on Viceland.  In an April 2020 interview, Thrasher editor-in-chief Michael Burnett said that Vice's decision to not renew King of the Road for a fourth season, along with the recent passing of previous editor-in-chief Jake Phelps, caused King of the Road to be put on hold in 2019 with the intention of it being brought back, possibly in a different format, later in 2020.  However, as of May 2022, no plans have been announced for a new King of the Road.

Skate Rock 
Thrasher released a music compilation series titled "Skate Rock" under the High Speed Productions label. Skate Rock was conceptualized by Mofo. The first release was in 1983, with Volume One, and continued until Volume Eight in 1990.

The series focused primarily on punk rock and thrash bands, and most of the bands were made up of skateboarders, including well known professionals and community stars such as Steve Caballero, Tony Alva, Bob Denike, Brian Brannon, Mofo, Pushead, Chuck Treece, and Claus Grabke. Of the seven volumes of Skate Rock, all volumes were produced as a cassette available through the magazine. Some volumes were also available as vinyl records.

Thrasher has organized multiple tours throughout the United States and worldwide under the name "Skate Rock".

References

External links 
 
 Year One: The First Twelve Issues Produced in Celebration of Thrasher Magazine's 25th Anniversary / Internet Archive

Magazines established in 1981
Magazines published in San Francisco
Monthly magazines published in the United States
Skateboarding magazines
Sports magazines published in the United States